The Women's under-23 points race at the European Track Championships was first competed in 1999.

Medalists

References

Results (Cyclingarchives.com)

 
under-23 points race
Women's points race